Selden Hills are a range of hills in Doña Ana County, New Mexico, USA. They lie just over a mile northwest of Radium Springs east of the Rio Grande at the lower end of Rincon Valley. They are named for Fort Selden that was located nearby to the southeast.

References

 

Landforms of Doña Ana County, New Mexico
Hills of New Mexico